ZX may refer to:

Arts and entertainment 
 Kamen Rider ZX (pronounced "Zed-Cross"), the tenth fictional superhero in the "Kamen Rider" franchise
 Mega Man ZX, a video game for the Nintendo DS
 ZX Tunes, remastered soundtracks of the "Mega Man ZX" game
 Z/X, Japanese collectible card game

Businesses and brands 
 ZX Auto, also known as Zitsubishi, a Chinese SUV and truck manufacturer
 Air Georgian (IATA airline code ZX)
 Chinasat, a family of communications satellites (from the transliteration, Zhongxing)
 Citroën ZX, a car model
 Kawasaki Ninja series motorcycles (model designation codes ZX and ZX-R)
 ZX80, ZX81 and ZX Spectrum, home computers produced by Sinclair